Sanjay Bhende (born 18 October 1970) is the Chairman of Nagpur Nagarik Sahakari Bank Ltd, Nagpur. He was BJP State Executive member since 2013–2015. He is now Chief of BJP Offices in Maharashtra State.

His name was selected by BJP committee for Nagpur Graduate Council election after Nitin Gadkari elected as Member Lok Sabha.

Personal & Family Life
Bhende was member of RSS since his childhood. Professionally Lecturer in Junior College at New English Highschool at Nagpur.

Social
He is also President of NGO Maitree Pariwar Sanstha, Nagpur.

Positions held

Within BJP

State Member, BJP 
General Secretary, BJP, Nagpur
Committee Member of Booth Handling, BJP

References

Businesspeople from Nagpur
Living people
1970 births